Radu Rogac (born 7 June 1995) is a Moldovan footballer who plays as a centre back for Romanian Liga II club Viitorul Târgu Jiu. In his career Rogac also played for teams such as Zaria Bălți, Dinamo Samarqand, Tarxien Rainbows or Ripensia Timișoara, among others.

International career
At international level, Radu Rogac plays for Moldova national football team and in the past also represented his home country in the U19 and U21 teams.

International stats

Honours 

Zaria Bălți
 Moldovan Cup: 2015–16

References

External links

 
 
 

1995 births
Living people
Sportspeople from Bălți
Moldovan footballers
Moldova youth international footballers
Moldova under-21 international footballers
Moldova international footballers
Association football defenders
Moldovan Super Liga players
Uzbekistan Super League players
Maltese Premier League players
Liga II players
CSF Bălți players
FC Ungheni players
CS Petrocub Hîncești players
FK Dinamo Samarqand players
Tarxien Rainbows F.C. players
FC Dinamo-Auto Tiraspol players
FC Ripensia Timișoara players
ACS Viitorul Târgu Jiu players
Moldovan expatriate footballers
Moldovan expatriate sportspeople in Uzbekistan
Expatriate footballers in Uzbekistan
Moldovan expatriate sportspeople in Malta
Expatriate footballers in Malta
Moldovan expatriate sportspeople in Romania
Expatriate footballers in Romania